Prince Mohammad bin Abdulaziz Stadium is a multi-use stadium in Medina, Saudi Arabia.  It is currently used mostly for football matches and is the home stadium for Al-Ansar and Ohod Club.  The stadium has a capacity of 24,000 people.

References

Football venues in Saudi Arabia